The Tennessee Equality Project is an LGBT organization in the United States state of Tennessee.

Overview
The Tennessee Equality Project was founded on June 15, 2004, in Nashville, Tennessee.

The organization has lobbied against a 2006 referendum to amend the state constitution to ban same-sex marriage, the dismissal of a lesbian soccer coach by Belmont University in 2010, the Don't Say Gay bill sponsored in 2011 by Sen. Stacey Campfield and Rep. Bill Dunn, and other public issues. It endorsed Nashville mayor Karl Dean for re-election in 2011.

In December 2015, TEP attempted to open an LGBT center in Maryville, the county seat of Blount County in partnership with local stakeholders, but this effort was ultimately unsuccessful.

The Project has received funds from the Human Rights Campaign and has partnered with the California-based Courage Campaign to develop political advertising based on the life story of an LGBT Tennessee resident. The organization is a member of the Equality Federation.

In April 2019, the TEP received a $113,000 donation and a handwritten letter of support from singer-songwriter Taylor Swift.

See also

 LGBT rights in Tennessee
 List of LGBT rights organizations

References

External links
Official website

LGBT political advocacy groups in Tennessee
2004 establishments in Tennessee
Organizations established in 2004
Organizations based in Nashville, Tennessee
Non-profit organizations based in Tennessee
Equality Federation
501(c)(4) nonprofit organizations